Jason is a surname. Notable people with the surname include:

 Anju Jason (born 1987), first Marshalese sportsperson to qualify for the Olympics (2008)
 David Jason (born 1940), British actor
 Leigh Jason (1904–1979), American film director and writer
 Peter Jason (born 1944), American actor
 Rick Jason (1923–2000), American actor

See also
 Jason (given name)
 Jason (disambiguation)

English-language surnames